In duplicate bridge, a sacrifice (a save in common usage) is a deliberate bid of a contract that is unlikely to make in the hope that the  points will be less than the points likely to be gained by the opponents in making their contract. In rubber bridge, a sacrifice is an attempt to prevent the opponents scoring a game or rubber on the expectation that positive scores on subsequent deals will offset the negative score.

Owing to the difference in the methods of scoring between duplicate and rubber bridge, a sacrifice bid in rubber bridge is much less likely to be advantageous and so strategies differ between the games. Comparable strategy differences exist between Matchpoints scoring and IMPs scoring games.

Scoring context

Sacrificing against game contracts

Accordingly, a sacrifice will be advantageous if the resultant loss in points is less than these amounts. 

Determination of the most number of tricks that can be lost to satisfy this condition is dependent upon the relative  of each partnership, i.e. whether one, the other, both or neither are vulnerable. The determination is also based upon the assumption that the opposition will double the sacrifice bid thereby increasing the penalty points. The table at the left summarises the various scenarios and outcomes.

In summary, when the opponents are likely to make a game contract, a sacrifice bid which is doubled is viable (i.e. one will still receive a positive relative duplicate score) if one can go down no more than:
 three tricks if vulnerability is favourable (shown in green)
 two if vulnerability is equal (shown in yellow)
 one if vulnerability is unfavourable (shown in red)

Similar reasoning can be drawn for sacrifices against potential  and  contracts and cases where one assumes that the contract will not be doubled.

Sacrificing against small slam contracts

When the opponents are likely to make a small slam contract, a sacrifice bid which is doubled is viable if one can go down no more than 
 six tricks if relative vulnerability is favourable against a small slam in a major or notrump
 five tricks if relative vulnerability is favourable against a small slam in a minor
 five tricks if relative vulnerability is equal where both sides are vulnerable against a small slam in a major or notrump
 four tricks if relative vulnerability is equal where both sides are vulnerable against a small slam in a minor
 four tricks if relative vulnerability is equal where both sides are not vulnerable against any small slam
 three tricks if relative vulnerability is unfavourable against any small slam

Sacrificing against grand slam contracts

When the opponents are likely to make a grand slam contract, a sacrifice bid which is doubled is viable if one can go down no more than 
 eight tricks if vulnerability is favourable
 seven tricks if both vulnerable
 six tricks if both not vulnerable
 five tricks if vulnerability is unfavourable.

Strategy
A sacrifice most often occurs when both sides have found a fit during bidding (eight cards or more in a suit), but the bidding indicates that the opponents can make a game or slam contract. Also, it is possible to perform an advance sacrifice, when it is more or less clear that the opponents have a fit somewhere and greater strength. For example, after the partner opens 1 and RHO doubles, the following hand is suitable for a bid of 5, outbidding opponents' major suit game in advance:

As seen in the table above, vulnerability significantly affects the sacrifice: success is most likely if the opponents are vulnerable but the sacrificing side is not. At equal vulnerabilities, sacrifices are less frequent, and vulnerable sacrifices against non-vulnerable opponents are very rare and often not bid deliberately. Also, the specific duplicate scoring method affects the tactics of sacrifice – at matchpoint scoring, −500 or −800 (down three or four) against −620 is a 50/50 probability for a top or bottom score, but at international match points (IMPs) it can gain 3 IMPs (120 difference) but lose 5 (180 difference), making it less attractive.

However, if it turns out that the sacrificing side misjudged, and that the opponents' contract was unmakeable (or unlikely to make), the sacrifice is referred to as a false or phantom one. A false sacrifice can cost heavily, as the sacrificing side has in effect turned a small plus into a (potentially large) minus score.

The Law of total tricks can be a guideline as to whether the sacrifice can be profitable or not.

Sacrifices are practically always made in a suit contract; sacrifices in notrump are extremely rare, but can occur, as in the following deal:

The bidding starts:

1 Michaels cuebid, indicating both majors.

South can see that East-West have a huge spade fit and that it's quite possible that they can make 4. However, the best sacrifice seems to be 4NT rather than 5; it requires a trick less and there is no indication that 5 would provide more tricks than 4NT. Indeed, 4NT is down one and 5 down two.

Other considerations in sacrifices 

The scoring matters a lot in sacrifices. Matchpoints scoring vs. IMP scoring makes a very significant difference in sacrifice decisions. 

Kit Woolsey suggests that the following three conditions should all be met for a sacrifice to make sense in Matchpoint scoring:
 The field is going to bid the game the opponents reached.
 The said game is very likely to make.
 Your doubled sacrifice is likely to not go down too much (i.e. maximum 1 down in unfavorable vul, max 2 in equal, and max 3 in favorable. Slam values are much higher)

See also
 Glossary of contract bridge terms
 Preempt

References

Contract bridge bidding